Maja Marcen (born 14 April 1982), is a Slovenian born athlete, who started archery in 1992. She originally competed for her home country of Slovenia, but now lives and competes for Colombia in compound archery.

She first competed for the Colombian national team in 2011, and in 2013 she won Gold in Antalya, and Silver medals in Team Women's competition at the 2013 Archery World Cup in Medellin, Colombia.

Marcen recently placed 1st at the 2014 Pan American Championships in women's team competition with Sara Lopez, and Alejandra Usquiano in Rosario Italy.

 Marcen's World Archery ranking is 32nd.

Achievements

1994
 7th, World Junior Championships 1994, Individual, Italy
2001
18th, Golden Arrow 072, individual, Antalya
2003
 42nd World Outdoor Target Championship 176, individual, New York City
2004
 20th, European Grand Prix 197, Individual, Rovereto
 23rd, European Outdoor Archery Championship 189, Individual, Brussels
 9th, European Grand Prix 199, Individual, Wyhl
 5th,  European Grand Prix 187, Individual, Antalya
2005
 24th, European Grand Prix 218, Individual, Antalya
 18ty, European Grand Prix 219, Individual, Antalya
 42nd, 43th World Outdoor Target Archery Championships 221, Individual, Madrid
2006
 14th, Meteksan World Cup Stage 1- EMAU Grand Prix 245, Individual, Porec
 9th, Meteksan World Cup Stage 2- EMAU Grand Prix 238, Individual, Antalya
 4th, World University Championships 256, Individual, Slovakia
 11th, European Grand Prix 242, Individual, Sassari
 20th, European Outdoor Target Championships 243, Individual, Athens
2007
 Slovenian Indoor Nationals, Individual, Slovenia
32nd, World Cup, individual, Varese
 World Outdoor Championships, Individual, Leipzig
12th, World Cup, individual, Dover
2008
 5th, Archery World Cup Stage 4 296, Individual, Boé, France
2009
2010
2011
 7th, Archery World Cup 2011 Stage 3, Individual, Utah
2012
2013
 4th,  Archery World Cup 2014 Stage 4, Team Women, Wroclaw
 33rd, Archery World Cup 2013 Stage 4, Individual, Wroclaw
 33rd, Archery World Cup 2013 Stage 3, Individual, Wroclaw
 Archery World Cup 2013 Stage 3, Team Women, Medellin
 Archery World Cup 2013 Stage 2, Team Women, Medellin
 33rd, Archery World Cup 2013 Stage 2, Individual, Wroclaw
2014
 Pan American Championships 2014, Team Women, Rosario
 Archery World Cup 2014 Stage 4, individual, Wroclaw
 9th, Pan American Championships 2014, Individual, Rosario
 9th, Archery World Cup 2014 Stage 4, Individual, Wroclaw
 33rd, Archery World Cup 2014 Stage 3, Individual Antalya
 5th, Archery World Cup 2014 Stage 3, Team Women, Antalya
 9th, Archery World Cup 2014 Stage 1, Individual, Shanghai
 7th, Archery World Cup 2014 Stage 1, Team Women, Shanghai
 9th, Arizona Cup 2014, Individual, Arizona
2015

References

External links
 

1982 births
Living people
Colombian female archers
Slovenian female archers
Slovenian emigrants to Colombia
20th-century Colombian women
21st-century Colombian women
20th-century Slovenian women
21st-century Slovenian women